The Eparchy of Lungro  (Italian: Eparchia di Lungro; Albanian: Eparhia e Ungrës) is a eparchy (diocese) of the Italo-Albanian Catholic Church, Eastern Catholic sui iuris of Byzantine Rite in Calabria, Italy.

History
It was created in 1919, as an eparchy directly subject to the Holy See, for members of the Italo-Albanian Catholic Church, the Catholics of the Byzantine Rite who had emigrated, mostly from Epirus and Albania, to Sicily and Calabria.

The diocese received territory from the Archdiocese of Rossano, Diocese of Cassano all'Jonio and Diocese of San Marco e Bisignano.

Ordinaries of Italia continentale of the Italo-Albanese Catholic Church
 Felice Samuele Rodotà † (17 September 1735 – 15 October 1740 died) from San Benedetto Ullano, titular archbishop of Beroe in Thrace.
 Nicolò De Marchis † (7 December 1742 – 2 June 1757 died) from Lungro, titular bishop of Nemesis in Thrace.
 Giacinto Archiopoli † (1757–1789) from San Demetrio Corone, titular bishop of Gallipoli in Thrace.
 Francesco Bugliari † (26 March 1792 – 17 August 1806 died) of Santa Sofia d'Epiro, titular bishop of Tagaste in today's Algeria.
 Domenico Bellusci † (18 September 1807 – 2 March 1833 died) of Frascineto, titular bishop of Sinope in today's Turkey.
 Gabriele De Marchis † (23 June 1833 – 18 April 1858 died) from Lungro, titular bishop of Tiberiopoli in Phrygia.
 Agostino Franco † (1858–1859) from Mezzojuso, titular bishop of Ermopoli Maggiore in today's Egypt.
 Giuseppe Bugliari † (10 September 1875 – 1888 deceased) from Santa Sofia d'Epiro, titular bishop of Dausara in Osroene.
 Giuseppe Schirò † (30 July 1889 – 29 November 1896) from Contessa Entellina, titular bishop of Gadara in Jordan and later archbishop holder of Neocesarea del Ponto.
 Giovanni Barcia † (24 April 1902 – 1912) from Palazzo Adriano, titular bishop of Croia in Albania.

Bishops of Lungro
 Giovanni Mele † (10 March 1919 – 10 February 1979 died)
 Giovanni Stamati † (20 February 1979 – 7 June 1987 died)
 Ercole Lupinacci † (30 November 1987 – 10 August 2010 withdrawn)
 Salvatore Nunnari (10 August 2010 – 12 May 2012) (apostolic administrator)
 Donato Oliverio, from 12 May 2012

See also
Arbëreshë people
Byzantine Rite
Italo-Albanian Catholic Church

Notes

External links 
  Official page
 Info and multimedia from the Eparchy of Lungro

Eastern Catholic dioceses in Europe
Italo-Albanian Catholic Church
Roman Catholic dioceses in Calabria
Christian organizations established in 1919
Eastern Catholic dioceses in Italy